Lake Plav is a lake in Plav municipality, in northeastern Montenegro.

About

It is the largest glacial lake in Montenegro, and is also the best-known tourist attraction in the area.

The whole Plav region nestles at the foot of the towering Accursed Mountains range and rests on the banks of Lake Plav.  The lake itself stretches from north to south for nearly a mile.

The lake itself is full of limestone caverns and there are many springs where water gushes forth from the earth.

References

Lake Plav and Ali-Pashas Springs

Plav
Plav
Accursed Mountains